Tyrol Basin is a ski and snowboard area located in the town of Vermont, Wisconsin, near Mount Horeb, Wisconsin. It has runs at beginner, intermediate, advanced and expert level. Tyrol Basin has 22 runs, and 300foot vertical, of average size for Midwest ski resorts. The ski area attracts many skiers and snowboarders from nearby Madison, Wisconsin.

Snow tubing
In 2019, Tyrol Basin added snow tubing as well as a new bar and concession building.

See also
List of ski areas and resorts in the United States

References

External links
Tyrol Basin Website 

Buildings and structures in Dane County, Wisconsin
Ski areas and resorts in Wisconsin
Tourism in Wisconsin
Tourist attractions in Dane County, Wisconsin